A dismutase is an enzyme that catalyzes a dismutation reaction.

Examples 
 Formaldehyde dismutase
 Superoxide dismutase
 Chlorite dismutase

References 

Oxidoreductases